George Peake may refer to:
 George Peake (clergyman)
 George Peake (Cleveland)
 George Peake (inventor)

See also
George Peek, American agricultural economist
George Peak, a peak in the Raft River Mountains of Utah